Dejair is a given name. It may refer to:

 Dejair (footballer, born 1977), Dejair Jorge Ferreira, Brazilian football midfielder
 Dejair (footballer, born 1994), Dejair Igor Silvério Ribeiro, Brazilian football defensive midfielder

See also
 Djair (disambiguation)